The Women's pentathlon competition at the 1968 Summer Olympics in Mexico City, Mexico was held at the University Olympic Stadium on October 15–16.

Competition format
The pentathlon consists of five track and field events, with a points system that awards higher scores for better results in each of the five components.  The five event scores are summed to give a total for the pentathlon.

Records
Prior to the competition, the existing World and Olympic records were as follows.

Overall results 
Key

References

External links
 Official Olympic Report, la84foundation.org. Retrieved August 17, 2012.

Pentathlon
1968
1968 in women's athletics
Women's events at the 1968 Summer Olympics